"The Killing Jar" is a song written, produced and recorded by English rock band Siouxsie & the Banshees.

The Killing Jar may also refer to;

 The Killing Jar (novel), a novel by Nicola Monaghan
 The Killing Jar, a novel by David Docherty
 The Killing Jar (film), a 2010 thriller directed by Mark Young
 Killing jar, a device used by entomologists to kill captured insects